The Sweden national rugby league team (nicknamed the Barbarians) was founded in 2008.

For more Swedish stats, news, team results and more visit Sweden's RLEF Page.

History
Rugby League in Sweden was founded by Scott Edwards in 2008. The first competitive rugby league on Swedish soil was the 2nd annual Scandinavian Nines Tournament, hosted by Spartacus Reds in Gothenburg in April 2010. Following the success of the 9's competition, a domestic league was founded in 2011, comprising three teams - Borås Ravens, Spartacus Reds and Gothenburg Lions.

Sweden competed in their first rugby league international on 30 October 2010 when they drew 20 - 20 against Norway. Robin Larsson was the first player to score a try for Sweden.

Sweden earned their first international rugby league win in July 2013, beating Norway in the Nordic Cup 40–22 in Oslo.
Later in the year, Sweden would win their first ever silverware, after they beat Denmark in August. This victory secured Sweden's  first ever Nordic cup title.

In 2015 Impact Prowear became the proud sponsors of Sweden Rugby League providing the kits for both the National team as well as all 4 domestic teams in the Impact Prowear Swedish Rugby League for the next three seasons.

All-time results record

Results

Current squad
22 September 2018 vs Netherlands;
Christoffer Andreasson
Robert Maun
Muller Qalibu
Christopher Vannerberg
Jonas Lyppert
Fabian Wikander
Andrew Bignell
Mark Beveridge
Ruaidhrí O’Brien
Peter Wiklund
Fakaosifolau Maake
Buster Derk
Theo Karlsson
Plamen Lazarov
Johnny Engstrom
Sebastian Johnson-Cadwell
Mathew Mitchell

See also

References

External links

National rugby league teams
Rugby League
Rugby league in Sweden